Sous l'Emprise des esprits  is a 1947 film.

Synopsis 
A polygamist tribe chief, Mutana, has two wives, one Christian and one pagan. After speaking with the witch doctor, the pagan wife poisons one of the Christian's wife's sons. Meanwhile, Mutana consults with the witch doctor who suggests he kill one of the Christian children to save his own child. However, he errs his target.

External links 

1947 films
Belgian black-and-white films
Films about witch doctors